Marco Maier (born 20 December 1999) is a German biathlete who competed at the 2022 Winter Paralympics.

Career
Maier represented Germany at the 2022 Winter Paralympics and won a silver medal in the men's 6 kilometres standing event.

References 

Living people
1999 births
Biathletes at the 2022 Winter Paralympics
Cross-country skiers at the 2022 Winter Paralympics
Medalists at the 2022 Winter Paralympics
Paralympic silver medalists for Germany
Paralympic medalists in biathlon
Paralympic medalists in cross-country skiing
Paralympic biathletes of Germany
Paralympic cross-country skiers of Germany
21st-century German people